Mußkopf is a mountain in the Allgäu Alps, which is located in Bavaria, Germany. Its peak is above a steep couloir, below the Rappensee Hut alpine hut. There is no marked trail to the peak.

References
 
 

Mountains of Bavaria
Mountains of the Alps